Portrait of Clemenceau may refer to:
Portrait of Clemenceau (Manet, Paris)
Portrait of Clemenceau (Manet, Fort Worth)